György Bartal the Younger de Beleháza (20 September 1820 – 25 October 1875) was a Hungarian politician, who served as Minister of Agriculture, Industry and Trade between 1874 and 1875. His father was the legal historian Sr. György Bartal.

References
 Magyar Életrajzi Lexikon

1820 births
1875 deaths
People from Tolna County
Agriculture ministers of Hungary
19th-century Hungarian politicians